is a former Japanese football player who featured only for Azul Claro Numazu.

Career
After attending Komazawa University, Nakajima joined Azul Claro Numazu for 2018 season. The defender immediately debuted with an assist in an away game against FC Tokyo U-23.

He surprisingly retired in January 2020.

Club statistics
Updated to 5 April 2020.

References

External links

Profile at J. League
Profile at Azul Claro Numazu

1995 births
Living people
Komazawa University alumni
Association football people from Shizuoka Prefecture
Japanese footballers
J3 League players
Azul Claro Numazu players
Association football defenders